Mao Zedong Statue may refer to:

 Mao Zedong Statue (Chengdu)
 Mao Zedong Statue (Fuzhou)